Harold 'Hal' Sox is an Editor Emeritus of the Annals of Internal Medicine and member of the National Academy of Medicine. Sox was an associate editor of Scientific American Medicine, a consulting associate editor of The American Journal of Medicine and a member of the editorial boards of three medical journals, including The New England Journal of Medicine.

Sox is the main author of the textbook Medical Decision Making (with M. A. Blatt, M. C. Higgins, and K. I. Marton, Butterworths, 1988; 2nd ed., with M. C. Higgins and D. K. Owens, Wiley, 2013).

Sox has been member of different national committees that have influenced clinical, educational, and public policy in the United States. He served as a chair of the U.S. Preventive Services Task Force, the Institute of Medicine Committee to Study HIV Transmission Through Blood Products, and the Institute of Medicine Committee on Health Effects of Exposures in the Persian Gulf War. He was president of the American College of Physicians.

References

External links 
 Harold C. Sox, M.D., Chair at the Robert Wood Johnson Foundation

Living people
Year of birth missing (living people)
Physicians from New Hampshire
Stanford University alumni
Harvard Medical School alumni
Dartmouth College faculty
American male writers
Members of the National Academy of Medicine